North Central Timor Regency is a regency in East Nusa Tenggara Province,  Indonesia. It covers an area of 2,669.70 km2, and had a population of 229,803 at the 2010 Census and 259,829 at the 2020 Census; the official estimate as at mid 2021 was 262,598. Its regency seat is located at the town of Kefamenanu, which had a population of 48,202 in mid 2021.  The regency borders Timor Leste's Oecusse enclave, one of few Indonesian regions that have a land border with other countries.

History 
North Central Timor Regency was de jure formed on 9 August 1958 from three autonomous royal regions (swapraja) but de facto function only began early November 1958 after its first regent was sworn in. Since 1915, the region had been part of Onderafdeeling Noord Miden Timor during Dutch rule; it was composed of the native kingdoms of Miomaffo, Insana, and Biboki. In 1921, the administrative seat was moved from the town of Noeltoko to its current location in Kefemenanu; the move is annually commemorated by the local government since 2005.

In 1942, the Japanese forces occupied the Dutch East Indies. Local government structure changed little under the Japanese, who mostly preserved it to simplify civil administration. In 1946, after the end of the Second World War, during the Malino Conference, the region's local rulers wanted to be included in Lesser Sunda province, together with Bali and West Nusa Tenggara, under the newly formed Indonesian Republic. Local administration was reorganized in 1949 after independence, and formed its own parliament under Timor Regional Law Number 10 of 1949. In a parliament session between 10 and 12 May 1950, it voted in favour of disbanding the State of East Indonesia under the United States of Indonesia and forming a unitary Indonesian state, which was realized not long after. Shortly before the creation of the regency, Lesser Sunda province was split into West Nusa Tenggara, Bali, and East Nusa Tenggara provinces.

During the Indonesian occupation of East Timor and the subsequent independence referendum and violence that followed, many civilians from East Timor fled to the regency, causing a huge increase in the population. Many were integrated into the regency's society to the point they constituted 8.1% of the regency's population. The regency was devastated by Cyclone Seroja in early 2021, prompting the relocation of several settlements and buildings by Indonesian government.

Geography 
North Central Timor Regency borders South Central Timor Regency in the south, the country East Timor in the north, Kupang Regency in the west, and Belu Regency in the east. Most of the regency has slopes below 40 degrees, consisting of 77.4%. Around 74%,  of the regency's area is used for plantation and agriculture, and only  are used for human settlement.

Most of the regency's soil is litosol and grumusol, and is relatively fertile. The region's climate is classified as semi-arid, which makes large-scale farming challenging due to low precipitation compared to other regions in Indonesia. To solve this, the government of Indonesia has built several new dams in the region to avoid drought and secure access to water for its population.

Between June and September, wind comes from Australia, bringing little water vapor to the region, and the dry season begins. The region is prone to drought and harvest failure.

Governance

Administrative Districts 
The regency is divided into twenty-four districts (kecamatan), tabulated below with their areas and their populations at the 2010 Census and the 2020 Census, together with the official estimates as at mid 2021. The table also includes the locations of the district administrative centres, the number of villages in each district(in total, 160 rural desa and 33 urban kelurahan), and its post code.

Local government 

North Central Timor Regency is a second-level administrative division equivalent to a city. The regency is headed by a regent, who is democratically elected. The regent directly appoints heads of districts with the recommendation of the regency secretary. Executive power lies with the regent and vice-regent, and legislative function is exercised by the regency's parliament.

Politics 
North Central Timor Regency, together with Belu Regency and Malaka Regency, which have 8 out of 65 representatives, is part of 7th electoral district in the provincial parliament. The regency's parliament consists of 30 representatives from four electoral districts. The most recent election was held in 2019 and the next is due to be held in 2024.

Economy 
The Regency's gross regional product (GRP) is dominated by agriculture, which makes up 39.82% of its economy. The second-biggest sector is administration with 16.77%, followed by construction with 9.55% and education with 7.41%. In 2020, the fastest-growing sector was electricity and gas, with a growth of 18.10%, followed by information and communication with 14.97%; the fastest-declining sector is mining with a decrease of 28.98% in the same year. Economic growth was 5.1% in 2019 but later fell to -0.55% because of COVID-19 pandemic. The regency has 32 registered market centers and 80 registered stores. From the scale, there are 123 trading facilities that area considered to facilitate large-scale trading by Indonesian Statistics. There were 62 active cooperatives .

Almost all of the regency's restaurants and hotels are located in Kefamenanu. As of 2020, there are 137 registered restaurants, of which 114 or 83% are located in Kefamenanu, and 11 hotels. In 2020, agriculture output included red onions (36 tons), garlic (30.3 tons), red chilli (18.7 tons), cabbages (41.2 tons), mustard greens (235.5 tons), and asparagus (16.9 tons). Other crops were coconuts (555 tons), cashews (913 tons), and candlenuts (1,655 tons) in the same year. The regency's livestock in 2020 includes 129,325 cows for meat consumption and 82,126 pigs. The fish catch was 748.3 tons and aquaculture yielded 162.4 tons of fish.

Demographics 
In the 2020 census, the population of the regency was 259,829, with a sex ratio of 100.53, which means there are roughly 101 males per 100 females within the population. As with most of Indonesia, the regency's population is young and dominated by a workforce above 15 years, consisting of 141,985 of the population. The most populous district is Kefamenanu, which has 47,776 people, around 18% of the regency's population; the town is also the economic center for the regency. West Miomaffo District has the lowest male–female sex ratio with 0.95:1, and the highest is Biboki Feotleu with 1.43:1.

In 2020, Catholic Christians comprised 90.13% of the population; 7.47% were Protestant Christians, and the remainder were Muslims, Hindus, and Buddhists. The literacy rate was 95.21% in 2020; male literacy was 96.11% and female literacy was 94.35%. The school participation rate was 98.87%. The same year, the regency's poverty rate of 22.28% was high relative to other regions in Indonesia.

Infrastructure

Education 

Education infrastructure in the regency includes 182 elementary schools, 85 junior highschools, 32 senior highschools, and 19 vocational highschools. There are two higher education institutions; University of Timor is a state-owned public university and one of only two public universities in the province, the other being University of Nusa Cendana in city of Kupang. University of Timor's main campus is located in Kefamenanu. Due to its close proximity and the lack of universities in neighbouring East Timor, many East Timorese students studied in the university; there were 6,000 in 2017. The regency has 21 registered kindergartens as of 2020.

Healthcare 
Within the healthcare sector, the regency has three hospitals, 10 polyclinics, 57 puskesmas, and six pharmacies as of 2020. The regency's main public hospital, Kefamenanu Regional Hospital, is owned by the regency government and classified C-class by the Ministry of Health. Leona General Hospital is a private hospital. Kiupukan Hospital, which is owned by Parish of Kiupukan, is significantly smaller than the other two.

Transport 

North Central Timor Regency has  of roads, out of which  have been paved with asphalt. Other than that,  of road have gravel surface, and the rest are either concrete or soil. The regency government owns  of roads, the rest are owned by either provincial or national government. There is no airport in the regency; the closest airport is located in Atambua, Belu Regency. A plan to build a new airport in the town Wini and build a special economic zone in the region has been mooted. An integrated border post facility (PLBN) is located in Wini, which has immigration facility, quarantine facility, helipad, storage, and a market. Indonesian integrated border posts are intended to be new economic centres and to serve as inter-border trading centres. A port facility, which is expected to be expanded as part of new special economic zone plan, is also located in Wini. On 2019, it served on average eight freight ships per month.

Religion
As of 2020, there are 60 mosques and 185 churches in the regency, according to Ministry of Religious Affairs.

References 

Regencies of East Nusa Tenggara